Windows Cyrillic + Finnish is a modification of Windows-1251 that was used by Paratype to cover languages that use the Cyrillic script such as Russian, Bulgarian, and Serbian Cyrillic on a Finnish language keyboard. This encoding is supported by FontLab Studio 5. This encoding is missing the letters Š and Ž which are used in loanwords in Finnish and can be replaced by the digraphs SH and ZH.

Character set
The following table shows Windows Cyrillic + Finnish. Each character is shown with its Unicode equivalent and its decimal code.

References 

Windows code pages
Finnish language